The Mogami-class frigate (also known as 30FFM, 30FF, 30DX, or 30DEX) is a Japanese multi-mission stealth frigate for the Japan Maritime Self-Defense Force (JMSDF).

Development 
In 2015 the Japanese defense budget allocated funds to study the construction of a new "compact-type hull destroyer with additional multi-functional capabilities" as well as a new radar system for the destroyer. In the same year Mitsubishi Heavy Industries (MHI) unveiled the frigate's first concept model (30FF) which they had been developing with their own funds.

In August 2017, the Acquisition, Technology & Logistics Agency (ATLA) selected MHI and Mitsui Engineering and Shipbuilding as the prime contractor and subcontractor to construct the frigate. In addition, the agency also selected a completely new design of the vessel (30DX). The new ship is set to replace the s and s.

Construction of the 30DX was to begin in 2018. A total of twenty-two units built to this design are planned by 2032, of which the first eight were under contract by 2018; a pair are to be built each year.

Design 

The overall intent of the 30DX design is to achieve a modern frigate-sized vessel with capabilities similar to the  but with a reduced crew and having only half the VLS cells.

30FF
The original intention was to use the 30FF model. The 30FF design looked similar to the United States Navy's  with an integrated mast. Its armament included a 5"/54 caliber Mark 45 gun, two remote weapon stations between the bridge and main gun, a SeaRAM above the helicopter hangar, and a helicopter.

30DX
However, it was the 30DX model that was eventually chosen to be constructed. The 30DX design (although modern) is more conservative compared to the 30FF's more radical approach. The three main factors for the design change were due to the need for affordability, miniaturization/automation, and multi-mission capabilities. The frigates will be powered by a Rolls-Royce MT30 gas turbine.

Weapons for the 30DX include a Mk 45 gun, two remote weapon stations above the bridge, 16-cell Mk 41 Vertical Launching System (VLS) at the bow, 8 anti-ship missiles, one SeaRAM, an SH-60L helicopter, torpedoes, and decoy launchers. Another capability is to deploy and recover unmanned underwater vehicles (UUV), unmanned surface vehicles (USV), and sea mines from the rear ramp beneath the helo deck. The 30DX will also expect to use a naval version of the JGSDF's Type 03 Chū-SAM long-range AA missile.

The stealthy design of both models is based on the research and development lessons learned from the Mitsubishi X-2 Shinshin (then: ATD-X) stealth fighter technology demonstrator, as both platforms are designed by Mitsubishi Heavy Industries. Along with stealth capabilities, the frigate also emphasizes having a high level of automation. This allows the frigate to possess a low crew size of only 90 personnel when compared to the crew complement of other ships of similar size.

Automation

At Sea Air Space 2019, Mitsubishi Heavy Industries revealed their 'Advanced Integrated CIC' for the vessel. According to the report, it will combined the wheelhouse, the managing and situational awareness room, the engine and power control room, and combat information center within a large 360-degree circular screen wall. It can display panoramic views around the ship without a blind spot on the screen, and will also utilize augmented reality technology to discriminate among the objects shown and to navigate the ship.

Operational concept 
On 16 December 2022, the Japanese Ministry of Defense released its Defense Buildup Program (防衛力整備計画) guidance which noted that the Japanese Maritime Self Defense Force plans to replace its fleet of older, less capable destroyers and destroyer escorts with Mogami-class frigates.

Ships in the class 

The FFM-7 and subsequent ships will be equipped with Vertical Launch System. Ships from FFM-1 to FFM-6 are commissioned without VLS and will be later equipped with VLS.

Export 
Both frigate designs have been showcased in four naval exhibitions to attract potential export customers. The 30FF was shown in PACIFIC 2015 as a contender for Australian Navy's SEA5000 ASW Frigate Program and on display again at Sea Air Space 2017. The 30DX design has also been shown in Sea Air Space 2018 (as well as 2019) and Euronaval 2018.

Japan plans to export four frigates to Indonesia, and another four will be built in Indonesia under ¥300 billion contract. In March 2021, Japan and Indonesia signed a military cooperation agreement, which reinforces the delivery.

References 

Frigate classes
Frigates of the Japan Maritime Self-Defense Force